Canadian National Exhibition Stadium (commonly known as Exhibition Stadium or CNE Stadium) was a multi-purpose stadium that formerly stood on the Exhibition Place grounds, in Toronto, Ontario, Canada. Originally built for Canadian National Exhibition events, the stadium served as the home of the Toronto Argonauts of the Canadian Football League, from 1959 to 1988, the Toronto Blue Jays of Major League Baseball from 1977 to 1989, and the Toronto Blizzard of the North American Soccer League from 1979 to 1983. The stadium hosted the Grey Cup game 12 times over a 24-year period.

In 1999, the stadium was demolished and the site was used for parking until 2006. BMO Field was built on the site in 2007 roughly where the northern end of the covered grandstand once stood.

The grandstand (known as CNE Grandstand) was used extensively throughout the summer months for hosting concerts.

History

CNE Grandstand
Exhibition Stadium was the fourth stadium to be built on its site since 1879. When the original grandstand was lost due to a fire in 1906, it was quickly rebuilt. This part of the stadium's structure stayed even as the stadium underwent various changes to its configuration over the years until its 1999 closure.

Many rock concerts were also held at the stadium, both the grandstand and the whole stadium were used for popular rock and pop acts such as The Who, U2, David Bowie, Chicago, New Order, Depeche Mode, Iron Maiden, Rush, Van Halen, Guns N' Roses, Kim Mitchell, Bruce Springsteen, INXS, Bon Jovi, AC/DC, Elton John, Whitney Houston and Janis Joplin.

Expansion for CFL football
When the Toronto Argonauts moved from Varsity Stadium for the 1959 season, a smaller  bleacher section was added along the south sideline. In this form the stadium seated 33,150.

The inaugural game at the renovated Exhibition Stadium was an exhibition interleague game between the hometown Toronto Argonauts of the Canadian Football League (CFL) and the Chicago Cardinals of the National Football League (NFL) on August 5, 1959. The game was the first time an NFL team played in Toronto. It was also the first NFL–CFL exhibition match held since the establishment of the CFL in 1958, and marked the beginning of a three-year, four game exhibition series between the leagues.

When the 58th Grey Cup was played at the stadium in 1970, Calgary Stampeders coach Jim Duncan described the condition of the natural-grass surface as "a disgrace." In January 1972, Metropolitan Toronto Council voted 15–9 to spend $625,000 to install artificial turf. The vote passed despite five councillors changing their vote to oppose the motion, because the cost had increased from a previous estimate of $400,000. Two months later, contracts totalling  were approved to install the AstroTurf, with work to be completed by June, in time for the start of the Toronto Argonauts' 1972 season.

Reconfiguration for baseball

In 1974, in a bid to acquire a Major League Baseball team, the city voted to reconfigure the stadium to make it compatible for baseball, leading to the arrival of Major League Baseball in Toronto in 1977 in the form of the expansion Toronto Blue Jays after a failed attempt to lure the San Francisco Giants to the city.

Football capacity was increased from 33,150 before the renovations to 41,890 initially, then finally to 54,741 after work was completed. Although the stadium was expanded to accommodate baseball, the new seats were first used for football and allowed the 64th Grey Cup in November 1976 to be watched by a then-Grey Cup record crowd of 53,467. For baseball, the stadium originally seated 38,522, however by the Blue Jays' second season this increased to 43,739, although, only about 33,000 seats were usually made available (see below).

Even in its new, expanded form, Exhibition Stadium was problematic for hosting both baseball and football. Blue Jays' President Paul Beeston noted Exhibition Stadium "wasn't just the worst stadium in baseball, it was the worst stadium in sports."

Baseball problems

Like most multi-purpose stadiums, the lower boxes were set further back than comparable seats at baseball-only stadiums to accommodate the wider football field. Compared to U.S. stadiums, this was magnified by the fact Canadian football fields are almost 34% larger than American football fields.
Many of the seats down the right-field line and in right-centre were extremely far from the infield; they actually faced each other rather than the action. The Blue Jays realized early on that these seats were too far from the field to be of any use during the regular season. As such, they were only sold when necessitated by demand during the 1985 and 1987 pennant races. 
As the original grandstand was used for the outfield seats, these were the cheapest seats but were the only ones which offered some protection from the elements; the Blue Jays were the only MLB team using a stadium with such a configuration.

Football problems
Because the full length of the third-base line had to be fitted between the north stand (the original grandstand) and the new south stand, they could no longer be parallel to each other. As a compromise between placements suitable for the two stands, the football field was rotated anticlockwise away from the north stand. Thus, the only seats as close to the field as before were those near the eastern end zone, and no seats had as good a view of the whole field as the centre-field seats before the conversion.

Although the Argonauts recorded average attendances of above 40,000 fans per game in the first few seasons following the stadium's expansion, by the mid-1980s average attendance had fallen to fewer than 30,000 fans per game.

Problems with the wind and cold

Being situated relatively close to Lake Ontario, the stadium was often quite cold at the beginning and end of the baseball season (and the end of the football season). The first Blue Jays game played there on April 7, 1977, was the only major league game ever played with the field covered entirely by snow. The Blue Jays had to borrow Maple Leaf Gardens' Zamboni to clear off the field. Conditions at the stadium led to another odd incident that first year. On September 15, Baltimore Orioles manager Earl Weaver pulled his team off the field because he felt the bricks holding down the bullpen tarps were a hazard to his players. This garnered a win by forfeit for the Jays – the only time in major league baseball history since 1914 that a team deliberately forfeited a game (as opposed to having an umpire call a forfeiture).

An April 30, 1984, game against the Texas Rangers was postponed due to  winds. Before the game, Rangers manager Doug Rader named Jim Bibby as his starting pitcher, stating "he's the heaviest man in the world, and thus will be unaffected by the wind." However, Bibby would never make it to the mound. Two Rangers batters complained about dirt swirling in their eyes, and Blue Jays starting pitcher Jim Clancy was blown off balance several times. The umpires stopped the game after only six pitches. After a 30-minute delay, the game was called off.

The stadium also occasionally had problems with fog, once causing a bizarre inside-the-park home run for Kelly Gruber in 1986, when an otherwise routine pop up was lost by the outfielders in the thick fog.

As a popular feeding ground for seagulls
Due to its position next to the lake, and the food disposed by baseball and football fans, the stadium was a popular feeding ground for seagulls. New York Yankees outfielder Dave Winfield was arrested on August 4, 1983, for killing a seagull with a baseball. Winfield had just finished his warm-up exercises in the 5th inning and threw a ball to the ball boy, striking a seagull in the head. The seagull died, and some claimed that Winfield hit the bird on purpose, which prompted Yankees manager Billy Martin to state "They wouldn't say that if they'd seen the throws he'd been making all year. It's the first time he's hit the cutoff man". The charges were later dropped. Winfield would later play for the Blue Jays, winning a World Series with the club in 1992.

70th Grey Cup and replacement
Exhibition Stadium's fate was sealed during the 70th Grey Cup in 1982, popularly known as "the Rain Bowl" because it was played in a driving rainstorm that left most of the crowd drenched. Many of the seats were completely exposed to the elements, forcing thousands of fans to watch the game in the concession section. To make matters worse, the washrooms overflowed. In attendance that day was then-Ontario Premier Bill Davis, and the poor conditions were seen by over 7.862 million television viewers in Canada (at the time the largest TV audience ever in Canada). The following day, at a rally at Toronto City Hall, tens of thousands of people who were there to see the Toronto Argonauts began to chant, "We want a dome! We want a dome!" So too did others who began to discuss the possibility of an all-purpose, all-weather stadium.

Seven months later, in June 1983, Premier Davis formally announced that a three-person committee would look into the feasibility of building a domed stadium at Exhibition Place. The committee consisted of Paul Godfrey, Larry Grossman and former Ontario Hydro chairman Hugh Macaulay. That same year, the city also studied a number of potential sites for the new domed stadium, and in April 1984, CN agreed to donate  of land near the CN Tower for the stadium; groundbreaking began in October 1986, and the stadium, which would take on the name SkyDome (now Rogers Centre), opened in June 1989.

Life following the opening of SkyDome and demolition

Exhibition Stadium mostly stayed inactive over the decade following the opening of SkyDome (being used sometimes as a racetrack or a parking lot), except for the occasional concert or minor sporting event. The World Wrestling Federation (now WWE), needing a new venue after a decision to discontinue events at Maple Leaf Gardens in 1995, held one card at the stadium on August 24, 1996, for a crowd of 21,211. The main event was Shawn Michaels vs. Goldust in a ladder match. A series of CASCAR races were held at the track during the 1990s, with the stadium being reconfigured for such races.

The stadium was demolished in 1999 and the site is now the location of BMO Field and a parking lot. A few chairs from the stadium can be found on the southeast corner just north of the bridge to Ontario Place's main entrance. As is common with stadium demolitions, a number of the remaining seats were sold to fans and collectors. The original locations of all bases and home plate are marked in the parking lot south of BMO Field.

The "Mistake by the Lake"
Although not widely used while the stadium was in operation (given the well known references to Cleveland's Municipal Stadium), the term "Mistake by the Lake" has been used more recently in reflection by Toronto media to refer to the now-demolished venue.

New stadium

On October 26, 2005, the City of Toronto approved  to build BMO Field, a new 20,000-seat stadium, in almost the same spot where the old stadium once was. Maple Leaf Sports & Entertainment got the naming rights of the new stadium, and has a Major League Soccer team in the new stadium, named Toronto FC. The stadium also held the 2007 FIFA U-20 World Cup along with other cities in Canada.

BMO Field was initially built as a soccer-specific stadium with field dimensions that were too small to accommodate a Canadian football field and was operated as such until 2015 when MLSE owners Larry Tanenbaum and Bell Canada agreed to purchase the Toronto Argonauts. As part of the agreement, BMO Field was renovated to allow the Argonauts to move back to the site in time for the 2016 CFL season. The stadium also hosted the 104th Grey Cup in 2016 and MLS Cups in 2010, 2016, and 2017, along with the outdoor NHL Centennial Classic game within a 35-day period.

Chevrolet Beach Volleyball Centre

For the 2015 Pan American Games and Parapan American Games, the old stadium footprint (parking lot) became the Chevrolet Beach Volleyball Centre. The temporary venue had bleachers and a playing area filled with 3,000 metric tonnes of sand. After the Pan American Games, the venue was torn down to allow for setup of rides and restore parking spaces for the 2015 Canadian National Exhibition opening on August 21 of the same year.

Facts and figures
On July 18, 1958, Richard Petty made the first of 1,184 starts in NASCAR Grand National Series competition in a race at the grandstand, entitled the 1958 Jim Mideon 500. Today, the roads of the Exhibition Place are used for the INDYCAR Honda Indy Toronto and since 2010 has hosted the NASCAR Pinty's Series.
The stadium was featured on a Season 4 Route 66 episode titled "A Long Way from St. Louie" which first aired on December 6, 1963. While on a helicopter tour over downtown Toronto, Tod Stiles and Linc Case (Martin Milner and Glenn Corbett, respectively) spot a quintet of girl musicians (two were played by Lynda Day and Jessica Walter), who were stranded in the city, sleeping on the benches in the covered north grandstand.
1967 saw the Canadian Armed Forces Tattoo 1967 perform eight shows at the stadium to standing ovations every night. So popular with crowds at the stadium of 30,000 most nights, the 89-year-old never on Sunday taboo had to be waived to permit the Tattoo to put on a Sunday, September 3 performance to accommodate the extraordinary demand for tickets. John Holden, a CNE official stated, "It was breathtaking. You just can't compare it with the like of anything that has come before it." CNE General Manager Bert Powell stated, "We've never had anything like it — fabulous and fantastic. My phone is never quiet. I'm even getting professional critics and entertainers begging for tickets, and that's the ultimate tribute."
On August 30, 1980, Queen performed a concert from The Game Tour.
Soccer Bowl '81 was played at Exhibition Stadium.
In 1982, the 70th Grey Cup game held at the stadium had the largest number of television viewers in Canadian history, with 7,862,000. The record has since been broken.
The Jacksons performed three concerts at the stadium on October 5, 6 and 7, 1984 during their Victory Tour in front of 180,000 in attendance.
In 1985, the first Game 7 in the history of the ALCS was played at the stadium. The Blue Jays lost to the Kansas City Royals, 6–2.
In August 1986, the stadium played host to the World Wrestling Federation's "Big Event" card in front of over 70,000 fans. The main event was then-World Heavyweight Champion Hulk Hogan against Paul Orndorff. This event did not air on pay-per-view.  
 Van Halen August 18, 1986, capacity concert sellout the first new tour with Sammy Hagar as lead singer
 Genesis sold out the stadium on September 22, 1986, at 8:00 P.M. to a sold-out crowd of 61,000 people as a part of their North American leg of the Invisible Touch Tour.
 Iron Maiden played the stadium in 1988 and 1992.
 U2 played the stadium on the Joshua Tree Tour on October 3, 1987, and on the Zoo TV Tour on September 5 and 6, 1992.
Madonna brought her Who's That Girl World Tour to the stadium on July 4, 1987, before a sold out crowd of 50,013 people.
Pink Floyd performed three concerts on September 21, 22 and 23, 1987 and next year on May 13, 1988, as part of their A Momentary Lapse of Reason Tour. They returned to the stadium for three nights on July 5, 6 and 7, 1994 as part of their The Division Bell Tour.
Bon Jovi played the stadium as part of their New Jersey Syndicate Tour on June 2, 1989.
The Rolling Stones performed at the stadium in September 3 and 4, 1989 during their Steel Wheels/Urban Jungle Tour.
Guns N' Roses played the stadium on back-to-back nights, June 7 and 8, 1991, as part of their Use Your Illusion Tour.
Guns N' Roses returned to the stadium in just over a year, on September 13, 1992, this time on a double bill with Metallica, performing as part of their joint Guns N' Roses/Metallica Stadium Tour, with Faith No More as the opening act.
Paul McCartney brought his New World Tour to the stadium on June 6, 1993. It would be his last show in Canada until April 2002.

A. Game was suspended with 9:29 remaining in the fourth quarter due to extremely dense fog, and completed the next day.

See also
Rogers Centre
Exhibition Place
Toronto FC
Toronto Blizzard (1971–84)
BMO Field

Notes

References

External links

Virtual Walking tour of Exhibition Place
Overhead photo of Exhibition Stadium 
BallparksOfBaseball.com
Ballparks.com
Several photos including CNE racetrack configuration
Baseball field diagram
Football configuration
Video about Exhibition Stadium (YouTube)
 The Governor General's Foot Guards Band with the band of the Royal Regiment of Canada at the Toronto Exhibition Stadium in 1984
Exhibition Stadium NASCAR's race results at Racing-Reference

Sports venues completed in 1959
Sports venues demolished in 1999
Defunct baseball venues in Canada
Defunct soccer venues in Canada
Defunct Canadian football venues
Canadian Football League venues
Defunct Major League Baseball venues
Defunct sports venues in Toronto
North American Soccer League (1968–1984) stadiums
Toronto Argonauts
Toronto Blue Jays stadiums
Multi-purpose stadiums in Canada
NASCAR tracks
1959 establishments in Ontario
1999 disestablishments in Ontario
Defunct motorsport venues in Canada
Defunct sports venues in Canada
Demolished buildings and structures in Ontario
Soccer venues in Ontario
Baseball venues in Ontario
Canadian football venues in Ontario
Demolished sports venues